Pannenhuis is a Brussels Metro station on line 6. It is located in Laeken, in the north-west of the City of Brussels, Belgium. It opened on 6 October 1982 and is named after the /, which is just to the west, in the municipality of Jette.

External links

 PANNENHUIS, BXEL.NET (French)

Brussels metro stations
Railway stations opened in 1982
City of Brussels
1982 establishments in Belgium